The Austria cricket team toured Belgium in July 2021 to play three Twenty20 International (T20I) matches at the Royal Brussels Cricket Club in Waterloo. The series was originally due to be held in May 2021, but was postponed due to the COVID-19 pandemic.

Belgium head coach Corey Rutgers resigned shortly before the series after a selection dispute resulted in ten of the players who toured Malta earlier in July either being dropped or later withdrawing from the squad to face Austria.

Belgium won the series 2–1.

Squads

T20I series

1st T20I

2nd T20I

3rd T20I

References

External links
 Series home at ESPN Cricinfo

Associate international cricket competitions in 2021
Cricket events postponed due to the COVID-19 pandemic